An American Tail: Fievel's Gold Rush is a platform game that was first released in Europe on March 1, 2002, for the Game Boy Advance, then in North America on May 2, 2003. Based on Universal Studios' An American Tail animated film franchise, the game was developed by Hokus-Pokus<ref name="mobygames">{{Cite web |title='An American Tail: Fievel's Gold Rush at MobyGames |url=https://www.mobygames.com/game/an-american-tail-fievels-gold-rush |access-date=2021-02-01 |website=MobyGames}}</ref> and published by Conspiracy Entertainment.

 Gameplay 
Players control series protagonist Fievel Mousekewitz, a rodent with an immigration card, in a traditional side-scrolling platformer as he travels West through 18 levels and six worlds, including "New York City" and "Gold Dust Gulch", to piece together Cat Malone's treasure map. Fievel will swing on rope, attack with his ten-gallon hat, ride riverboats, and jump the train to find Wylie Burp's gold. Fievel's goal is to rescue his kidnapped family members and friends as well as to find the gold.

Conspiracy Entertainment published the game for a "young audience who loved the films and direct-to-video sequels".

 Reception 

The game received mediocre reviews from critics. French website Jeuxvideo.com'' stated that "it takes a real pleasure to play in an environment so worked. The levels are quite varied and different to want to continue. The characters are very fine and loyal to the cartoon. The animation is very fluid. You will never be hampered by a slowdown and this regardless of the number of enemies displayed[...] particular attention was brought to the soundtrack. It is really very good quality and quite adapted to crossed levels. But there also are somewhat regretted the lack of diversity in the music". The publication pointed out that the title appeals to younger players due in part to the game's short length.

References

External links 
 

2002 video games
An American Tail (franchise)
Game Boy Advance games
Game Boy Advance-only games
Platform games
Video games developed in Denmark
Video games about mice and rats
Western (genre) video games
Conspiracy Entertainment games
Crave Entertainment games
Single-player video games